Judge Harvey may refer to:

Alexander Harvey II (1923–2017), judge of the United States District Court for the District of Maryland
Matthew Harvey (1781–1866), judge of the United States District Court for the District of Massachusetts
R. James Harvey (1922–2019), judge of the United States District Court for the Eastern District of Michigan

See also
Judge Steve Harvey, 2022 American arbitration-based reality court comedy show hosted by Steve Harvey
Justice Harvey (disambiguation)